The American Mathematics Competitions (AMC) are the first of a series of competitions in secondary school mathematics that determine the United States team for the International Mathematical Olympiad (IMO). The selection process takes place over the course of roughly four stages. At the last stage, the Mathematical Olympiad Summer Program (MOP), the United States coaches select six members to form the IMO team. The United States Math Team of 1994 is the first of the only two teams ever to achieve a perfect score (all six members earned perfect marks), and is colloquially known as the "dream team".

There are three levels:
 the AMC 8, for students under the age of 14.5 and in grades 8 and below
 the AMC 10, for students under the age of 17.5 and in grades 10 and below
 the AMC 12, for students under the age of 19.5 and in grades 12 and below

Students who perform well on the AMC 10 or AMC 12 competitions are invited to participate in the prestigious American Invitational Mathematics Examination (AIME). Students who perform well on the AIME are then invited to the United States of America Mathematical Olympiad (USAMO) or United States of America Junior Mathematical Olympiad (USAJMO). Students who do exceptionally well on the USAMO (typically around 30 students) are invited to go to the Mathematical Olympiad Summer Program (MOSP or more commonly, MOP), and six students are selected from the top twelve scorers on the USAMO (through yet another competition, the Team Selection Test (TST)) to form the United States International Math Olympiad Team.

American Mathematics Competitions is also the name of the organization, based in Washington, DC, responsible for creating, distributing and coordinating the American Mathematics Competitions contests, which include the American Mathematics Contest, AIME, and USAMO.  The American Mathematics Competitions organization also conducts outreach to identify talent and strengthen problem-solving in middle and high school students.

History

The AMC contest series includes the American Mathematics Contest 8 (AMC 8) (formerly the American Junior High School Mathematics Examination) for students in grades 8 and below, begun in 1985; the American Mathematics Contest 10 (AMC 10), for students in grades 9 and 10, begun in 2000; the American Mathematics Contest 12 (AMC 12) (formerly the American High School Mathematics Examination) for students in grades 11 and 12, begun in 1950; the American Invitational Mathematics Examination (AIME), begun in 1983; and the USA Mathematical Olympiad (USAMO), begun in 1972.

Benefits of participating

There are certain rewards for doing well on the AMC tests.  For the AMC 8, a perfect score may earn a book prize or a plaque (as it did for the students who achieved perfect scores in 2002); a list of high scoring students is also available to colleges, institutions, and programs who want to attract students strong in mathematics.  This may earn a high scorer an invitation to apply to places like MathPath, a summer program for middle schoolers.  The top-scoring student in each school is also awarded a special pin.

For the AMC 10 and AMC 12, a high score earns recognition (in particular, perfect scorers' names and pictures are published in a special awards book); as with the AMC 8, a list of high-scoring students is also available to colleges, institutions, etc.  The top-scoring student in each school is awarded a special pin, or a bronze, silver, or gold medal, depending on how many times he or she was the top scorer.

In addition, high scorers on the AMC 10 and AMC 12 qualify to take the next round of competitions, the 3-hour long American Invitational Mathematics Examination (AIME), typically held in March or April. Any student who scores in the top 2.5% on the AMC 10 or scores in the top 5% on the AMC 12 is invited to take the AIME.

The combined scores of the AMC 12 and the AIME are used to determine approximately 270 individuals that will be invited back to take a 9-hour, 2-day, 6-problem session of proofs known as the United States of America Mathematical Olympiad (USAMO), while the combined scores of the AMC 10 and the AIME are used to determine approximately 230 individuals that will be invited to take the United States of America Junior Mathematical Olympiad (USAJMO), which follows the same format. Approximately thirty students are selected based on their USAMO performance to be trained at the Mathematical Olympiad Summer Program, or MOSP (better known as MOP to its participants). Approximately 12 of the top USAJMO scorers are invited as well. Unless qualifying for a particularly high level, all students must be in 9th grade or higher to be admitted into MOSP, and high school seniors are admitted only if they are members of that year's IMO team.

During this summer camp, a 3-day competition (the TSTST) is held to determine the approximately 18 individuals who will form the TSTST group. These individuals take a series of contests throughout the year, such as the Asian Pacific Mathematics Olympiad, to finally pick the 6 member US Mathematics Team that will represent the US at the International Math Olympiad.  The current head coach of the US IMO team is Po-Shen Loh from Carnegie Mellon University.

Rules and scoring

AMC 8

The AMC 8 is a 25 multiple-choice question, 40-minute competition designed for middle schoolers. No problems require the use of a calculator, and their use has been banned since 2008. The competition was previously held on a Thursday in November. However. starting in 2022, the competition will be held in January.

The AMC 8 is scored based on the number of questions answered correctly only.  There is no penalty for getting a question wrong, and each question has equal value.  Thus, a student who answers 23 questions correctly and 2 questions incorrectly receives a score of 23.

Rankings and awards

Ranking

Based on questions correct:
 Distinguished Honor Roll: Top 1% (has ranged from 19–25)
 Honor Roll: Top 5% (has ranged from 15–19) 

Awards
 A Certificate of Distinction is given to all students who receive a perfect score.
 An AMC 8 Winner Pin is given to the student(s) in each school with the highest score.
 The top three students for each school section will receive respectively a gold, silver, or bronze Certificate for Outstanding Achievement.
 An AMC 8 Honor Roll Certificate is given to all high scoring students.
 An AMC 8 Merit Certificate is given to high scoring students who are in 6th grade or below.

AMC 10 and AMC 12

The AMC 10 and AMC 12 are 25 question, 75-minute multiple choice competitions in secondary school mathematics containing problems which can be understood and solved with pre-calculus concepts. Calculators have not been allowed on the AMC 10/12 since 2008.

High scores on the AMC 10 or 12 can qualify the participant for the American Invitational Mathematics Examination (AIME).  On the AMC 10, the top 2.5% make it, typically around 100 to 115 points. On the AMC 12, the top 5% make it, typically around 85 to 95 points.

The competitions are scored based on the number of questions answered correctly and the number of questions left blank.  A student receives 6 points for each question answered correctly, 1.5 points for each question left blank, and 0 points for incorrect answers.  Thus, a student who answers 24 correctly, leaves 1 blank, and misses 0 gets  points.  The maximum possible score is  points; in 2020, the AMC 12 had a total of 18 perfect scores between its two administrations, and the AMC 10 also had 18.

From 1974 until 1999, the competition (then known as the American High School Math Examination, or AHSME) had 30 questions and was 90 minutes long, scoring 5 points for correct answers. Originally during this time, 1 point was awarded for leaving an answer blank, however, it was changed in the late 1980s to 2 points. When the competition was shortened as part of the 2000 rebranding from AHSME to AMC, the value of a correct answer was increased to 6 points and the number of questions reduced to 25 (keeping 150 as a perfect score). In 2001, the score of a blank was increased to 2.5 to penalize guessing. The 2007 competitions were the first with only 1.5 points awarded for a blank, to discourage students from leaving a large number of questions blank in order to assure qualification for the AIME. For example, prior to this change, on the AMC 12, a student could advance with only 11 correct answers, presuming the remaining questions were left blank. After the change, a student must answer 14 questions correctly to reach 100 points.

The competitions have historically overlapped to an extent, with the medium-hard AMC 10 questions usually being the same as the medium-easy ones on the AMC 12. However, this trend has diverged recently, and questions that are in both the AMC 10 and 12 are in increasingly similar positions. Problem 18 on the 2022 AMC 10A was the same as problem 18 on the 2022 AMC 12A.  Since 2002, two administrations have been scheduled, so as to avoid conflicts with school breaks. Students are eligible to compete in an A competition and a B competition, and may even take the AMC 10-A and the AMC 12-B, though they may not take both the AMC 10 and AMC 12 from the same date. If a student participates in both competitions, they may use either score towards qualification to the AIME or USAMO/USAJMO.

See also
 American Invitational Mathematics Examination (AIME)

 United States of America Mathematical Olympiad (USAMO)

 Mathematical Olympiad Summer Program (MOSP or MOP)

 International Mathematical Olympiad (IMO)

 Mandelbrot Competition

 List of mathematics competitions

References

External links 
 
 Problems and Solutions from past AMC exams
 The Art of Problem Solving: AMC Forum
About AMC

Mathematics competitions
Recurring events established in 1950